Landshut is an electoral constituency (German: Wahlkreis) represented in the Bundestag. It elects one member via first-past-the-post voting. Under the current constituency numbering system, it is designated as constituency 228. It is located in southeastern Bavaria, comprising the city of Landshut, the Kelheim district, and most of the Landkreis Landshut district.

Landshut was created for the inaugural 1949 federal election. Since 2013, it has been represented by Florian Oßner of the Christian Social Union (CSU).

Geography
Landshut is located in southeastern Bavaria. As of the 2021 federal election, it comprises the independent city of Landshut, the Kelheim district, and the Landkreis Landshut district excluding the Verwaltungsgemeinschaften of Gerzen and Wörth a.d.Isar.

History
Landshut was created in 1949. In the 1949 election, it was Bavaria constituency 14 in the numbering system. In the 1953 through 1961 elections, it was number 209. In the 1965 through 1998 elections, it was number 214. In the 2002 and 2005 elections, it was number 229. Since the 2009 election, it has been number 228.

Originally, the constituency comprised the independent city of Landshut and the districts of Landkreis Landshut, Kelheim, Mainburg, and Rottenburg an der Laaber. In the 1976 through 2013 elections, it comprised the city of Landshut and the districts of Landkreis Landshut and Kelheim. In the 2017 election, it lost the Verwaltungsgemeinschaft of Gerzen from the Landkreis Landshut district. In the 2021 election, it lost the Wörth a.d.Isar Verwaltungsgemeinschaft.

Members
The constituency has been held by the Christian Social Union (CSU) during all but one Bundestag term since its creation. It was first represented by Elimar Freiherr von Fürstenberg from 1949 to 1953. He was elected for the Bavaria Party (BP), but joined the CSU in January 1951. Hans Schuberth won it for the CSU in 1953 and served one term. He was succeeded by Friedrich Zimmermann, who was representative from 1957 to 1990, a total of nine consecutive terms. Wolfgang Götzer served from 1990 to 2013. Florian Oßner was elected in 2013, and re-elected in 2017 and 2021.

Election results

2021 election

2017 election

2013 election

2009 election

Notes

References

Federal electoral districts in Bavaria
1949 establishments in West Germany
Constituencies established in 1949
Landshut
Kelheim (district)
Landshut (district)